Galen Bruce Jackman (born 1951) is a retired United States Army Major General.  His last assignment in the Army was serving in the Pentagon as the Army's Chief Legislative Liaison.  The Office of the Chief Legislative Liaison (United States Army) (OCLL) operates directly under the Office of the Secretary of the Army.  Its mission is to coordinate efforts between the US Army and Congress.  Prior to his assignment with the OCLL, he was the first commanding general of the Joint Force Headquarters National Capital Region (JFHQ-NCR), a dual-hatted role combined with commanding the Military District of Washington (MDW).

After his retirement from the U.S. Army, Jackman was hired in October 2008 by Raytheon Company, a Massachusetts-based defense contractor, as the vice-president over U.S. Army Programs, U.S. Business Development. 

Jackman may be best known for his role during the seven days in June 2004 that marked the death and state funeral of Ronald Reagan. As the then-commanding general of the MDW (CG MDW), he became a known figure when he escorted former First Lady Nancy Reagan, the former president's wife.

Early life
Jackman was born in August 1951 in Scottsbluff, Nebraska and is one of at least three children born to Virgil and Maxine Jackman.  At the time of his birth, Jackman's parents lived in the nearby city of Gering, where the family lived until they moved to Nebraska's capital, Lincoln, in 1965. Jackman graduated from Lincoln East High School in 1969.

Military career
Jackman attended the University of Nebraska-Lincoln on an Army ROTC scholarship. While at the University he became an active member of the National Society of Pershing Rifles, an ROTC military fraternal organization known for including many who later became successful Army officers. Upon graduation he was commissioned into active duty in the U.S. Army in June 1973. His first duty assignment was with the 1st Battalion (ABN) 508th Infantry, 82nd Airborne Division, Fort Bragg, North Carolina, where he served as a rifle platoon leader, anti-tank platoon leader, company executive officer, and battalion adjutant. He next served with the 1st Battalion, 21st Infantry, 25th Infantry Division, Schofield Barracks, Hawaii, as a battalion S4, rifle company commander, and battalion S3. Following assignment as a Procurement Officer with the United States Missile Command, Redstone Arsenal, Alabama, he served at Fort Bragg as Procurement Officer, Squadron Executive Officer, and Support Squadron Commander in 1st Special Forces Operational Detachment-Delta (Airborne) (1st SFOD-D(A)), more commonly known as "Delta Force."

Jackman has commanded the 1st Battalion, 14th Infantry, 25th Infantry Division (Light); 2nd Brigade, 7th Infantry Division (Light), Fort Ord, California; and the Ranger Training Brigade, Fort Benning, Georgia. It was under then-Colonel Jackman's command at the Ranger Training Brigade that four Ranger Candidates were killed in training on February 15, 1995 in the Florida swamps of Eglin Air Force Base.  Killed were Captain Milton Palmer, Second Lieutenant Curt G. Sansoucie, Second Lieutenant Spencer D. Dodge, and Sergeant Norman Tillman.  It was reported to be the worst incident in the Ranger School's 44-year history .  Multiple accounts held the leadership climate, both at the command level and at the trainer level, responsible for the multiple errors that led to the training accident and deaths.  Among the reasons named for the deaths include the command's lack of a proper risk assessment of the weather conditions surrounding the exercise before it took place and the Ranger trainers' decision to continue with the exercise despite poor training conditions and high water dangers.  As a result of the accident, the Ranger School's command changed swamp training to include more food and sleep for trainees and now require trainers to go into potentially high water before their trainees do.  No evidence exists to suggest that Jackman suffered any career-related consequences due to the incident.

Following his command at the Ranger Training Brigade, Jackman served as the Director of Combined Arms and Tactics at the United States Army Infantry School at Fort Benning, as well as the Deputy J3 for Training and Readiness, United States Pacific Command (USPACOM), Hawaii.  He was then assigned as Chief of Staff, 10th Mountain Division (Light Infantry), Fort Drum, New York, during which he participated as part of NATO's "Follow-on Force" in Operation Joint Forge, Bosnia-Herzegovina. Shortly thereafter he was made Assistant Division Commander for Support for the 10th Mountain Division.

Jackman served as Director of Operations, United States Southern Command (USSOUTHCOM) from 2001–2003, concentrating mostly on anti-drug and anti-terrorism endeavours.  He took command of the MDW in mid-2003 and subsequently the JFHQ-NCR in late 2004 at its official inception.  While in this dual command capacity, Jackman organized the proceedings and security for the dedication of the World War II Memorial on the National Mall and its accompanying WWII reunion, organized former President Ronald Reagan's state funeral, served as the official escort to the former President's wife, former First Lady Nancy Reagan, and served as commander of the Joint Task Force-Armed Forces Inaugural Committee for President George W. Bush's 2005 Presidential Inauguration. Jackman was assigned as the Army's Chief of Legislative Liaison on July 21, 2005. He retired from that position, and the U.S. Army after 35 years of service, in July 2008.

Personal life
In 1982 Jackman married Cathy (née Dowd), herself the daughter of a retired Army officer. Cathy Jackman is originally from Fayetteville, North Carolina and is a 1970 graduate of Terry Sanford High School.  The Jackmans have two sons, David and Patrick.  David Jackman is a graduate of Guilford College in Greensboro, North Carolina.

Qualifications and decorations

Education and training
Jackman graduated from the University of Nebraska at Lincoln in 1973 with a Bachelor of Arts degree in History.  After entering the U.S. Army in June, he completed the three-month Infantry Officer Basic Course, United States Army Infantry School, Fort Benning, Georgia, towards the end of 1973.  He later completed the six-month Infantry Officer Advanced Course, also at the United States Army Infantry School, in 1978.  In 1983, Jackman graduated after attending the US Army Command and General Staff College at Fort Leavenworth, Kansas after nearly a year of study. That same year, he earned a Masters of Science degree in Acquisition/Procurement and Contract Management from the Florida Institute of Technology.  Finally, Jackman attended the Industrial College of the Armed Forces, (Ft. Lesley J. McNair in SW Washington, D.C.), completing his year-long studies in 1992.

Dates of rank
Second Lieutenant: 19 May 1973
First Lieutenant: 6 June 1975
Captain: 6 June 1977
Major: 1 March 1984
Lieutenant Colonel: 1 June 1989
Colonel: 1 September 1993
Brigadier General: 1 August 2000
Major General: 1 October 2003

Decorations, awards and badges
  Distinguished Service Medal
  Defense Superior Service Medal with oak leaf cluster
  Legion of Merit with oak leaf cluster
  Defense Meritorious Service Medal
  Meritorious Service Medal with two oak leaf clusters
  Army Commendation Medal with two oak leaf clusters
  Army Achievement Medal
  Joint Meritorious Unit Award
  National Defense Service Medal with bronze star
  Armed Forces Expeditionary Medal with bronze star
  Humanitarian Service Medal
  Army Service Ribbon
  Overseas Service Ribbon with Arabic numeral 3
  NATO Medal
Expert Infantryman Badge
Master Parachutist Badge
Air Assault Badge
Ranger Tab
Army Staff Identification Badge

See also

Notes

References
Jackman's Career Biography current up through July 2005 via MDW Homepage
Executive Agent for State Funerals
Family Escort for Reagan Funeral
JTF-AFIC Homepage
Sen. Carl Levin Tribute to Jackman upon his retirement

1951 births
Florida Institute of Technology alumni
Living people
Nancy Reagan
People from Lincoln, Nebraska
People from Scottsbluff, Nebraska
Pershing Riflemen
Recipients of the Distinguished Service Medal (US Army)
Recipients of the Legion of Merit
United States Army generals
University of Nebraska–Lincoln alumni
United States Army Command and General Staff College alumni
Recipients of the Defense Superior Service Medal
People from Gering, Nebraska
Recipients of the Humanitarian Service Medal